Professor Samuel Frank Berkovic  (born 1953) is an Australian neurologist and Laureate Professor in the Department of Medicine, University of Melbourne and Director of the Epilepsy Research Centre at Austin Health.

Education
He earned a Bachelor of Medicine, Bachelor of Surgery and B.MedSci from the University of Melbourne in 1977, and an M.D. from University of Melbourne, in 1985.

Research and career
His research interest is in epilepsy genetics.

Awards and honours

He is a Fellow of the Royal Australasian College of Physicians.

On 13 June 2005, Berkovic was appointed a Member of the Order of Australia (AO) for service to medicine as a neurologist, particularly in the field of epilepsy research and treatment.

In 2005 he won the Zülch Prize of the Max Planck Society.

Also in 2005, he was elected a Fellow of the Australian Academy of Science.

In 2007 he was elected a Fellow of the Royal Society.

On 26 January 2014, he was appointed a Companion of the Order of Australia (AC) for eminent service to biomedical research in the field of epilepsy genetics as a leading academic and clinician, to the study of neurology on a national and international level, and as an ambassador for Australian medical science education.

In 2015 he was elected a Fellow of the Australian Academy of Health and Medical Sciences

Prof. Berkovic is the recipient of 37th TS Srinivasan Endowment Oration Award 2017 and the keynote speaker at the TS Srinivasan - NIMHANS Knowledge Conclave 2017.

References

1953 births
Living people
Australian neuroscientists
Academic staff of the University of Melbourne
Fellows of the Australian Academy of Science
Melbourne Medical School alumni
Companions of the Order of Australia
Australian Fellows of the Royal Society
Fellows of the Royal Australasian College of Physicians
Place of birth missing (living people)
Fellows of the Royal Society
Fellows of the Australian Academy of Health and Medical Sciences
Members of the National Academy of Medicine